Baramita Airport  is an airport serving the Amerindian village of Baramita, in the Barima-Waini Region of Guyana.

See also

 List of airports in Guyana
 Transport in Guyana

References

External links
Baramita Airport
OpenStreetMap - Baramita
OurAirports - Baramita

Airports in Guyana